Marcus Daniell and Artem Sitak were the defending champions, but decided not to participate this year.

Philip Bester and Peter Polansky won the title, defeating Enzo Couacaud and Luke Saville 6–7(5–7), 7–6(7–2), [10–7] in the final.

Seeds

Draw

References
Main Draw

Challenger Banque Nationale de Granby
Challenger de Granby